The 2022 ZLM Tour was the 33rd edition of the ZLM Tour cycling stage race. It started on 8 June in Kapelle and ended on 12 June in Rijsbergen and was part of the 2022 UCI ProSeries.

Teams
Three UCI WorldTeams, five UCI ProTeams, nine UCI Continental teams and the Dutch national team made up the eighteen teams that participated in the race.

UCI WorldTeams

 
 
 

UCI ProTeams

 
 
 
 
 

UCI Continental Teams

 
 
 
 
 
 
 
 
 

National Teams

 Netherlands

Route

Stages

Stage 1
8 June 2022 – Kapelle to Kapelle,

Stage 2
9 June 2022 – Veere to Goes,

Stage 3
10 June 2022 – Heythuysen to Buchten,

Stage 4
11 June 2022 – Rucphen to Mierlo,

Stage 5
12 June 2022 – Made to Rijsbergen,

Classification leadership table

 On stage 2, Sam Welsford, who was second in the points classification, wore the blue jersey, because first placed Olav Kooij wore the yellow jersey as the leader of the general classification. On stage 3 and 4, Elia Viviani wore the blue jersey for the same reason.
 On stage 2, Tim van Dijke, who was second in the young rider classification, wore the white jersey, because first placed Olav Kooij wore the yellow jersey as the leader of the general classification. On stage 3, Tomáš Kopecký wore the blue jersey for the same reason. On stage 4, Mick van Dijke wore the white jersey for the same reason.

Final classification standings

General classification

Points classification

Young rider classification

Team classification

References

External links

Ster ZLM Toer
ZLM Tour
ZLM Tour
ZLM Tour
ZLM Tour